The 2010 European Junior and U23 Canoe Slalom Championships took place in Markkleeberg, Germany from 4 to 8 August 2010 under the auspices of the European Canoe Association (ECA) at the Kanupark Markkleeberg artificial course. It was the 12th edition of the competition for Juniors (U18) and the 8th edition for the Under 23 category. A total of 17 medal events took place. No medals were awarded for the U23 women's C1 individual and team events due to low number of participating countries. The junior women's C1 team event did not take place. It was the first time that women's C1 class appeared at the European Junior and U23 Championships.

Medal summary

Men

Canoe

Junior

U23

Kayak

Junior

U23

Women

Canoe

Junior

U23

Kayak

Junior

U23

Medal table

References

External links
European Canoe Association

European Junior and U23 Canoe Slalom Championships
European Junior and U23 Canoe Slalom Championships